All Mixed Up may refer to:

Songs 
 "All Mixed Up" (311 song)
 "All Mixed Up" (The Cars song)
 "All Mixed Up", a song by Gayle and Gillian Blakeney
 "All Mixed Up", a song by Pete Seeger

Albums 
 All Mixed Up (Gospel Gangstaz album)
 All Mixed Up (EP), an EP by Korn
 All Mixed Up: Los Remixes, an album by A.B. Quintanilla III Y Los Kumbia Kings
 All Mixed Up (Alexander O'Neal album), 1987

Television and film 
 "All Mixed Up" (Barney & Friends), an episode of Barney & Friends
 "All Mixed Up" (Cougar Town), the first episode of Season 2 Cougar Town
 All Mixed Up (film), a French comedy film of 1985

See also 
 The Whole SHeBANG: All Mixed Up, an album by SHeDAISY